Ritva Sarin-Grufberg (born 17 May 1944) is a politician in the Åland Islands, an autonomous and unilingually Swedish territory of Finland.

Mayor of Mariehamn 2003-2007
Minister of industry and trade 2001-2003
Member of the lagting (Åland parliament) 1999-2001
Mayor of Mariehamn 1988-1999

She is married to Lennart Grufberg.

References

1944 births
Living people
Women mayors of places in Finland
Women government ministers of Åland
20th-century Finnish women politicians
21st-century Finnish women politicians